HMS Ace (P414) was the name allocated to an  of the Royal Navy which was laid down on 3 December 1943 and launched at Devonport Dockyard on 14 March 1945 during the Second World War.

She was not completed because of the end of the war, however the hull was used for explosives testing before arrival in June 1950 to Messrs. Smith & Houston of Port Glasgow, Scotland to be broken up.

References

Amphion-class submarines
1945 ships